Leandro Santiago Peñalver González (born May 23, 1961 in Matanzas) is a retired Cuban athlete who competed in the sprints. His personal best is 10.06 seconds, achieved in Caracas in 1983. Despite having much international success, he never competed in the Olympics, as Cuba boycotted both the 1984 Summer Olympics and the 1988 Summer Olympics.

International competitions

1 Representing the Americas

External links
 

1961 births
Living people
Sportspeople from Matanzas
Cuban male sprinters
Pan American Games gold medalists for Cuba
Pan American Games silver medalists for Cuba
Athletes (track and field) at the 1983 Pan American Games
Athletes (track and field) at the 1987 Pan American Games
Athletes (track and field) at the 1991 Pan American Games
World Athletics Championships medalists
World Athletics Championships athletes for Cuba
Pan American Games medalists in athletics (track and field)
Universiade medalists in athletics (track and field)
Central American and Caribbean Games gold medalists for Cuba
Competitors at the 1982 Central American and Caribbean Games
Competitors at the 1986 Central American and Caribbean Games
Goodwill Games medalists in athletics
Universiade gold medalists for Cuba
Central American and Caribbean Games medalists in athletics
Medalists at the 1985 Summer Universiade
Competitors at the 1990 Goodwill Games
Medalists at the 1983 Pan American Games
Medalists at the 1987 Pan American Games
Medalists at the 1991 Pan American Games
Friendship Games medalists in athletics